Hamlet is a Spanish five-piece metal band from Madrid, formed in 1987. They are signed to Maldito Records and have released twelve albums, their most recent being Berlín in 2018. They are considered the pioneers of alternative metal in Spain with their albums Sanatorio de Muñecos (1994) and Revolución 12.111 (1996).

History
Hamlet's history goes back to the late 1980s, when the five members decided to form a band using the name of one of the best-known works of writer William Shakespeare.
After several concerts, they recorded a mini LP titled "Hamlet" with a style influenced by the era of hard rock. They continued to use the same style in the first official recording of the group, but with some changes (including formation). Peligroso was released in 1992 by DRO. The group was not very happy with the final work and this is the reason why the record is widely unknown.

1993: Sanatorio de Muñecos ("The True Beginning") 
More concerts and self-promotion lead J. Molly, Luis Tárraga, Pedro Sanchez, Paco Sanchez, and Augusto Hernandez to move to Tampa, Florida in 1993 to Morrisound Studios with producer and owner Tom Morris (Sepultura, Coroner, Morbid Angel) and record their second proper album Sanatorio de Muñecos. Without pressure, they were able to express all their musical influences (Sepultura, Pantera, Faith No More), and Hamlet formed their own sound. Their lyrics involve current topics and fans praise their musical evolution.

Discography

Albums

DVDs

Other song appearances

References

External links
Official website
Official fotolog
Hamlet on Facebook

Spanish alternative metal musical groups
Groove metal musical groups
Spanish heavy metal musical groups
Nu metal musical groups
Musical quintets
Locomotive Music artists
Roadrunner Records artists